Horses is the debut studio album by American musician Patti Smith. It was released on November 10, 1975 by Arista Records. A fixture of the mid-1970s underground rock music scene in New York City, Smith signed to Arista in 1975 and recorded Horses with her band at Electric Lady Studios in August and September of that year. She enlisted former Velvet Underground member John Cale to produce the album.

The music on Horses was informed by the minimalist aesthetic of the punk rock genre, then in its formative years. Smith and her band composed the album's songs using simple chord progressions, while also breaking from punk tradition in their propensity for improvisation and embrace of ideas from avant-garde and other musical styles. Smith's lyrics on Horses were alternately rooted in her own personal experiences, particularly with her family, and in more fantastical imagery. The album also features adaptations of the rock standards "Gloria" and "Land of a Thousand Dances".

At the time of its release, Horses experienced modest commercial success and placed in the top 50 of the American Billboard 200 albums chart, while being widely acclaimed by music critics. Recognized as a seminal recording in the history of punk and later rock movements, Horses has frequently appeared in professional lists of the greatest albums of all time. In 2009, it was selected by the Library of Congress for preservation into the National Recording Registry as a "culturally, historically, or aesthetically significant" work.

Background
Through frequent live performances over the previous year, by 1975 Patti Smith and her band had established themselves as a popular act within the New York City underground rock music scene. Further increasing their popularity was their highly attended two-month residency at the New York City club CBGB with the band Television early that year. The hype surrounding the residency brought Smith to the attention of music industry executive Clive Davis, who was scouting for talent to sign to his recently launched label Arista Records. After being impressed by one of her live performances at CBGB, Davis offered Smith a seven-album recording deal with Arista, and she signed to the label in April 1975.

Smith's vision for her debut album was, in her words, "to make a record that would make a certain type of person not feel alone. People who were like me, different ... I wasn't targeting the whole world. I wasn't trying to make a hit record." The title Horses reflected Smith's desire for a rejuvenation of rock music, which she found had grown "calm" in reaction to the social turmoil of the 1960s and the deaths of numerous prominent rock musicians. She elaborated: "Psychologically, somewhere in our hearts, we were all screwed up because those people died ... We all had to pull ourselves together. To me, that's why our record's called Horses. We had to pull the reins on ourselves to recharge ourselves ... We've gotten ourselves back together. It's time to let the horses loose again. We're ready to start moving again."

Recording

Arista arranged for Smith to begin recording Horses in August 1975. Smith initially suggested that the album should be produced by Tom Dowd. Plans were made to book studio time with Dowd at Criteria in Miami, but these were complicated by his relationship with rival label Atlantic Records. Nonetheless, Smith had a change of heart and instead set out to enlist Welsh musician John Cale, formerly of the Velvet Underground, to produce Horses, as she was impressed by the raw sound of his solo albums, such as 1974's Fear. Cale, who had previously seen Smith perform live and was acquainted with her bassist Ivan Král, accepted.

Horses was recorded at Electric Lady Studios in New York City, with Smith retaining the same backing band with whom she performed live—Jay Dee Daugherty on drums, Lenny Kaye on guitar, Ivan Král on bass guitar, and Richard Sohl on keyboards. Cale recalled that the band initially "sounded awful" and played out of tune due to their use of damaged instruments, forcing him to procure the band new instruments before work on the album began. The differences between the work ethics of Cale, who was an experienced recording artist, and of Smith, who at this point was primarily a live performer, became apparent early on in recording, and were a source of tension between the two artists, who frequently argued in the studio.

The sole guest musicians on Horses were Allen Lanier of Blue Öyster Cult and Tom Verlaine of Television. Cale had wished to augment the band's playing on certain songs with strings, but Smith vehemently opposed this idea. Lanier, who was Smith's boyfriend at the time, did not get along with Cale and particularly Verlaine. This tension culminated with Lanier and Verlaine getting into a physical altercation during the final recording session, held on September 18.

By the end of recording, and for some years immediately following the album's release, Smith was quick to downplay Cale's contributions and suggested that she and her band had ignored his suggestions entirely. In a 1976 interview with Rolling Stone, Smith described his experience:

Cale said in 1996 that Smith initially struck him as "someone with an incredibly volatile mouth who could handle any situation", and that as producer on Horses he wanted to capture the energy of her live performances, noting that there "was a lot of power in Patti's use of language, in the way images collided with one another." He described their working relationship during recording as "confrontational and a lot like an immutable force meeting an immovable object." Smith would later attribute much of the tension between herself and Cale to her inexperience with formal studio recording, recalling that she was "very, very suspicious, very guarded and hard to work with" and "made it difficult for him to do some of the things he had to do." She expressed gratitude for Cale's persistence in working with her and her band and found that his production on Horses made the most out of their "adolescent and honest flaws".

Musical style

Smith characterized Horses as "three-chord rock merged with the power of the word". Describing the music on the album, Consequences Lior Phillips noted a minimalist quality that "matched the tone of" the nascent punk rock genre. Author Joe Tarr identified a punk sensibility in the music's reliance on simple chord progressions, while William Ruhlmann of AllMusic cited Lenny Kaye's rudimentary guitar playing, the "anarchic spirit" of Smith's vocals, and the emotionally charged nature of Smith's lyrics as being representative of punk. Tarr wrote that the band "proudly flaunted a garage rock aesthetic", and that Smith "sang with the delirious release of an inspired amateur", emphasizing "honest passion" over technical proficiency. Smith's vocals on the album alternate between being sung and spoken, an approach that, according to Peter Murphy of Hot Press, "challenged the very notion of a demarcation" between the two forms.

AllMusic critic Steve Huey observed that Horses borrowed ideas from the avant-garde, with the music showcasing the band's free jazz-inspired interplay and improvisation, while still remaining "firmly rooted in primal three-chord rock & roll." He called Horses "essentially the first art punk album." Smith and her band's propensity for improvisation differentiated them from most of their punk contemporaries, whose songs rarely diverged from straightforward three-chord structures. Throughout Horses, they also tempered their punk sound with elements of other musical styles, balancing more conventional rock songs with excursions into reggae ("Redondo Beach") and jazz ("Birdland").

Lyrics
Fiona Sturges of The Guardian described Smith's lyrics on Horses as being steeped in "intricate phrasing and imagery" that "deliberately blurred the lines between punk and poetry." CMJ writer Steve Klinge found that the album's lyrics recalled the energy of Beat poetry and the "revolutionary spirit" of French poet Arthur Rimbaud, one of Smith's primary influences. Smith drew on different sources of lyrical inspiration on Horses, with some songs being autobiographical and others being rooted in dreams and fantastical scenarios. She left the genders of the songs' protagonists ambiguous, a stylistic choice she said was "learnt from Joan Baez, who often sang songs that had a male point of view", while also serving as a declaration "that as an artist, I can take any position, any voice, that I want."

Smith's experiences with her family inspired certain songs on Horses. "Redondo Beach", whose lyrics concern a woman who commits suicide following a quarrel with the song's narrator, was written by Smith after an incident involving her and her sister Linda. The two had gotten into a heated argument, prompting Linda to leave their shared apartment and not return until the next day. "Kimberly" is a dedication to its namesake, Smith's younger sister, and finds the singer recounting a childhood memory of holding Kimberly in her arms during a lightning storm. In "Free Money", Smith describes growing up in poverty in New Jersey and recalls her mother fantasizing about winning the lottery.

Smith penned other songs about notable public figures. "Birdland" was inspired by A Book of Dreams, a 1973 memoir of Austrian psychoanalyst Wilhelm Reich by his son Peter, and revolves around a narrative in which Peter, at his father's funeral, imagines leaving on a UFO piloted by his father's spirit. "Break It Up" was written about Jim Morrison, lead singer of the Doors. Its lyrics are based on Smith's recollection of her visit to Morrison's grave in Père Lachaise Cemetery, as well as a dream in which she witnessed a winged Morrison stuck to a marble slab, trying and eventually succeeding in breaking free from the stone. "Elegie" is a requiem for rock musician Jimi Hendrix, incorporating a line from his song "1983... (A Merman I Should Turn to Be)". It was recorded, per Smith's request, on the fifth anniversary of Hendrix's death, which fell on September 18, the final day of recording. Smith said that the song was also intended to pay tribute to other deceased rock musicians such as Jim Morrison, Brian Jones, and Janis Joplin.

Two songs on Horses are adapted from rock standards: "Gloria", a radical re-imagining of the Them song incorporating verses from Smith's own poem "Oath", and "Land", already a live favorite, which features the first verse of Chris Kenner's "Land of a Thousand Dances". In "Land", Smith weaves the imagery of the Kenner song into an elaborate narrative about a character named Johnny—an allusion to the similarly named homoerotic protagonist of William S. Burroughs' 1971 novel The Wild Boys—while additionally referencing Arthur Rimbaud and, less directly, Jimi Hendrix, whom Smith imagined to be the song's protagonist, "dreaming a simple rock-and-roll song, and it takes him into all these other realms." The characterization of Johnny in "Land" was also inspired by photographer Robert Mapplethorpe—who was a close friend of Smith and shot the picture of her used for the Horses album cover—and his experiences in the New York S&M scene; in her memoir Just Kids (2012), Smith refers to Mapplethorpe and Burroughs, sitting together in CBGB, as "Johnny and the horse".

Artwork

The cover photograph for Horses was taken by Robert Mapplethorpe at the Greenwich Village penthouse apartment of his partner Sam Wagstaff. Smith, shrouded in natural light, is seen wearing a plain white shirt, which she had purchased at a Salvation Army shop on the Bowery, and slinging a black jacket over her shoulder and her favorite black ribbon around her collar. Embedded on the jacket is a horse pin that Allen Lanier had given her. Smith described her appearance as recalling those of French poet Charles Baudelaire and, in the slinging of the jacket, American singer and actor Frank Sinatra. She recalled that Mapplethorpe "took, like, twelve pictures, and at about the eighth one, he said, 'I have it.' I said, 'How do you know?' and he said, 'I just know,' and I said, 'Okay.' And that was it."

The black-and-white treatment and androgynous pose were a departure from the typical promotional images of female singers of the time. Arista executives wanted to make various changes to the photograph, but Smith overruled their suggestions. Clive Davis later wrote that he was initially conflicted about the image, recognizing its "power" but feeling that it would confuse audiences unfamiliar with Smith and her style of music. He put aside his reservations and approved the cover after coming to a realization that he needed "to trust her artistic instincts thoroughly".

Feminist writer Camille Paglia later referred to the Horses cover photograph as "one of the greatest pictures ever taken of a woman." In 2017, World Cafe presenter Talia Schlanger wrote that "Smith's unapologetic androgyny predates a time when that was an en vogue or even available option for women, and represents a seminal moment in the reversal of the female gaze. Smith is looking at you, and could care less  what you think about looking at her. That was radical for a woman in 1975. It is still radical today." Smith herself stated that she had not intended to make a "big statement" with the cover, which she said simply reflected the way she dressed. "I wasn't thinking that I was going to break any boundaries. I just like dressing like Baudelaire," she remarked in 1996.

Release and reception
On September 18, 1975, the same day that they finished recording Horses, Smith and her band performed a live show in support of the upcoming album at an Arista convention, where they were personally introduced by Clive Davis. They previewed five songs from the album: "Birdland", "Redondo Beach", "Break It Up", "Land", and, as their encore, "Free Money". In a contemporary account, journalist Lisa Robinson reported that the performance was met with an "ecstatic" response from the Arista executives in attendance. Horses was released on November 10, 1975. Commercially, it performed respectably for a debut album, despite receiving little radio airplay. In the United States, Horses peaked at number 47 on the Billboard 200 albums chart, remaining on the chart for 17 weeks. The album also managed chart placings in Australia, where it reached number 80; Canada, where it reached number 52; and the Netherlands, where it reached number 18. To promote Horses, Smith and her band toured the US and made their network television debut performing on the NBC variety show Saturday Night Live, then traveled to Europe for an appearance on the BBC Two music show The Old Grey Whistle Test and a short tour. "Gloria" was released as a single in April 1976. Smith's cover of the Who's "My Generation", performed live in Cleveland, served as the single's B-side.

Horses was met with near-universal acclaim from music critics. Music journalist Mary Anne Cassata said that it was roundly hailed as "one of the most original first albums ever recorded." Reviewing the album for Rolling Stone, John Rockwell wrote that Horses is "wonderful in large measure because it recognizes the overwhelming importance of words" in Smith's work, covering a range of themes "far beyond what most rock records even dream of." Rockwell highlighted Smith's adaptations of "Gloria" and "Land of a Thousand Dances" as the most striking moments on the record, finding that she had rendered the songs "far more expansive than their original creators could have dreamed." In Creem, Lester Bangs wrote that Smith's music "in its ultimate moments touches deep wellsprings of emotion that extremely few artists in rock or anywhere else are capable of reaching", and declared that with "her wealth of promise and the most incandescent flights and stillnesses of this album she joins the ranks of people like Miles Davis, Charles Mingus, or the Dylan of 'Sad Eyed Lady' and Royal Albert Hall." The Village Voices Robert Christgau said that while the album does not capture Smith's humor, it "gets the minimalist fury of her band and the revolutionary dimension of her singing just fine."

Horses attracted some detractors in the British music press. Street Life reviewer Angus MacKinnon found that the album's minimalist sound merely reflected Smith and her band's musical incompetence. Steve Lake's scathing review of Horses for Melody Maker attacked the album as an embodiment of "precisely what's wrong with rock and roll right now", panning it as "completely contrived 'amateurism'" with a "'so bad it's good' aesthetic". Conversely, Jonh Ingham of Sounds published a five-star review of Horses, naming it "the record of the year" and "one of the most stunning, commanding, engrossing platters to come down the turnpike since John Lennon's Plastic Ono Band". Charles Shaar Murray of NME called it "an album in a thousand" and "an important album in terms of what rock can encompass without losing its identity as a musical form, in that it introduces an artist of greater vision than has been seen in rock for far too long." English television host and future Factory Records co-founder Tony Wilson was so enthused by the record that he made repeated attempts to book Smith and her band for an appearance on his Granada Television program So It Goes.

At the end of 1975, Horses was voted the second best album of the year, behind Bob Dylan and the Band's The Basement Tapes, in the Pazz & Jop, an annual poll of American critics published in The Village Voice. NME placed Horses at number 13 on its year-end list of 1975's best albums. According to writer Philip Shaw in his 33⅓ book profiling the album, the enthusiastic reaction to Horses from the music press quickly assuaged observers' suspicions that Smith had sold out by signing to a major label. The positive critical reception, along with substantial promotional efforts by Arista, ensured that Horses enjoyed healthy, if not particularly high, sales.

Legacy and influence

Horses cemented Smith as a central figure in the punk rock scene that was emerging in New York City around the time of the album's release. It has been frequently cited as the first punk rock album, and as one of the key recordings of the punk movement. In The Observer, Simon Reynolds wrote: "Pipping the Ramones' first album to the post by five months, Horses is generally considered not just one of the most startling debuts in rock history but the spark that ignited the punk explosion." Publications such as Q and Rolling Stone have ranked it among the best punk albums of all time. Horses is considered a landmark for both punk and new wave music, inspiring "a raw, almost amateurish energy for the former and critical, engaging reflexivity for the latter", according to Chris Smith in his book 101 Albums That Changed Popular Music (2009). Philip Shaw stated that the album "created the template" for subsequent rock music of an "intelligent and self-conscious, yet visceral and exciting" sensibility, identifying its influence on the alternative rock, indie rock, and grunge movements that followed the punk era. Variety critic David Sprague said that "Horses—which became the first major-label punk-rock album when Arista unleashed it in 1975—not only helped spread the gospel of Bowery art-punk around the world, it set the tone for smart, unbending female rockers of generations to come."

Various musicians have credited Horses as an influence. Viv Albertine of the Slits stated that the album "absolutely and completely changed" her life, adding: "Us girls never stood in front of a mirror posing as if we had a guitar because we had no role models. So, when Patti Smith came along, it was huge. She was groundbreakingly different." Siouxsie and the Banshees frontwoman Siouxsie Sioux, naming "Land" as a recording she considered particularly influential on her, remarked that "apart from Nico, Patti was the first real female writer in rock." R.E.M.'s Michael Stipe bought a copy of Horses as a high school student and said that the album "tore [his] limbs off and put them back on in a whole different order", citing Smith as his primary inspiration for becoming a musician. Morrissey and Johnny Marr shared an appreciation for the record, and one of their early compositions for the Smiths, "The Hand That Rocks the Cradle", uses a melody based on that of "Kimberly". Courtney Love of Hole recounted that listening to Horses as a teenager helped encourage her to pursue a career in rock music, while PJ Harvey commented in 1992: "I heard Horses once and it was brilliant—not so much her music as her delivery, her words, her articulation. Her honesty." KT Tunstall wrote her hit single "Suddenly I See" (2004) about how she felt inspired to embrace her musical ambitions after seeing Smith on the cover of Horses.

Horses has often been named by music critics as one of the all-time greatest albums. Lars Brandle of Billboard wrote that the album had come to be regarded as "one of the finest in recorded music history." It has appeared in numerous professional lists of the best albums of the 1970s and of all time. In 2003 and 2012, Horses was ranked at number 44 on Rolling Stones list of the 500 greatest albums of all time, later placing at number 26 on a 2020 updated list. NME named it the 12th greatest album of all time in a similar list published in 2013. In 2006, Time named Horses as one of the "All-Time 100 Albums", and The Observer listed it as one of 50 albums that changed music history. Three years later, the album was preserved by the Library of Congress into the National Recording Registry for being "culturally, historically, or aesthetically significant". Horses was inducted into the Grammy Hall of Fame in 2021.

For the 30th anniversary of Horses, the full album was performed live by Smith on June 25, 2005 at the Royal Festival Hall, during the Meltdown festival, which Smith curated. She was backed by original band members Lenny Kaye and Jay Dee Daugherty, as well as Tony Shanahan on bass guitar and piano, Tom Verlaine on guitar, and Flea on bass guitar and trumpet. In 2015, Smith performed Horses in its entirety at a series of concerts celebrating its 40th anniversary. The 30th anniversary performance was released on November 8, 2005 as the second disc of a double CD titled Horses/Horses, with the digitally remastered version of the original 1975 album, along with the bonus track "My Generation", on the first disc. For the release, the live set was recorded by Emery Dobyns and mixed by Dobyns and Shanahan. The original album has also been reissued in remastered form several other times, including on June 18, 1996 (both as a standalone CD and as part of the CD box set The Patti Smith Masters), and on April 21, 2012, on LP for that year's Record Store Day celebration.

Track listing

Notes
 On CD reissues of the album, Chris Kenner is credited as the sole writer of part two of "Land" ("Land of a Thousand Dances").

Personnel
Credits are adapted from the album's liner notes.

Band
 Patti Smith – vocals
 Jay Dee Daugherty – drums
 Lenny Kaye – lead guitar
 Ivan Král – bass guitar, guitar
 Richard Sohl – piano

Additional personnel
 John Cale – production
 Frank D'Augusta – engineering (assistant)
 Bob Heimall – design
 Bernie Kirsh – engineering, mastering
 Allen Lanier – guitar on "Elegie"
 Bob Ludwig – mastering
 Robert Mapplethorpe – photography
 Tom Verlaine – guitar on "Break It Up"

Charts

Certifications

References

Bibliography

Further reading

External links
 Horses at Acclaimed Music (list of accolades)
 
 

1975 debut albums
Patti Smith albums
Albums produced by John Cale
Albums recorded at Electric Lady Studios
Arista Records albums
Grammy Hall of Fame Award recipients
United States National Recording Registry recordings
United States National Recording Registry albums